The De Vinne Press Building, located at 393-399 Lafayette Street at the corner of East 4th Street, in the NoHo district of lower Manhattan, New York City, is a brick structure, built in 1885-1886 and designed by the firm of Babb, Cook & Willard in Romanesque Revival style. An addition was made to the building in 1892.

History

Theodore Low De Vinne, a leading New York typographer and printer who was one of nine men who founded the Grolier Club (an organization devoted to the history of printing), had the building constructed for his printing company.  The press printed several leading American magazines, including the St. Nicholas Magazine, Scribner's Monthly and The Century.  De Vinne also wrote books such as The Invention of Printing, Correct Composition and Title Pages.  De Vinne died in February 1914, and by 1922, the company ceased operations.

In 1904, architect and art critic Russell Sturgis said in The Architectural Record that "No photographs give the full sense of its bigness, its breadth and its mass. More than once visitors on their way to see it have been pulled up suddenly by a sudden sense of its large presence."  In 2003, architectural historian Christopher Gray of The New York Times described the building as "among the most sophisticated works of masonry in New York, a tour de force of honestly simple bricklaying built for one of the premier printing companies of a century ago."

Originally, De Vinne's financial stake in the property was limited to 25 percent with the remainder held by Roswell Smith, founder of the Century Company.  Seven years after the press closed, De Vinne's heirs sold their interest to Smith's estate in 1929.  The building later became a metalwork factory, and in 1938, the Smith estate sold the property to the Walter Peek Paper Corporation.  In 1982, Walter Peek sold the building to Edwin Fisher. It is now occupied by the 11,000 square foot Astor Center, owned by the Fisher family.  The Astor Center featured a classroom and a "dining area for tastings and wine dinners."

As of 2014, the building was home to Astor Wines and Spirits (run by Andrew Fisher, son of Edwin Fisher), André Balazs Properties, the Orchard (a digital distribution company), the Shootdigital photo studio and production company, and Helpern Architects (founded by David Paul Helpern), among others.

Landmark status
The De Vinne Press Building was designated a New York City landmark in 1966, and was added to the National Register of Historic Places in 1977.

References

External links

Full-text digitized copy of an early De Vinne Press book - Jean Grolier de servier Viscount d'Aguisy : some account of his life and of his famous library by William Loring Andrews

Buildings and structures on the National Register of Historic Places in Manhattan
Commercial buildings completed in 1886
Babb, Cook and Willard buildings
New York City Designated Landmarks in Manhattan